The 1991 NHL Supplemental Draft was the sixth NHL Supplemental Draft. It was held on June 21, 1991.

Selections by round

Round one
The first round was limited to the expansion San Jose Sharks and teams that missed the 1991 Stanley Cup playoffs.

Round two

See also
1991 NHL Entry Draft
1991 NHL Dispersal and Expansion Drafts
1991–92 NHL season
List of NHL players

References

External links
 1991 NHL Supplemental Draft player stats at The Internet Hockey Database

1991
Draft